Gerrit Jan Arnold Jannink (1 December 1904 in Enschede – 7 March 1975 in Ross-on-Wye, Great Britain) was a Dutch field hockey player who competed in the 1928 Summer Olympics.

He was a member of the Dutch field hockey team, which won the silver medal. He played all four matches as forward and scored two goals.

External links
 
Profile

1904 births
1975 deaths
Dutch male field hockey players
Olympic field hockey players of the Netherlands
Field hockey players at the 1928 Summer Olympics
Olympic silver medalists for the Netherlands
Sportspeople from Enschede
Olympic medalists in field hockey
Medalists at the 1928 Summer Olympics
20th-century Dutch people